Macedonia (officially under the provisional appellation "former Yugoslav Republic of Macedonia", abbreviated "FYR Macedonia") participated in the Eurovision Song Contest 2005 with the song "Make My Day" written by Dragan Vučić and Branka Kostić. The song was performed by Martin Vučić. The Macedonian broadcaster Macedonian Radio Television (MRT) organised the national final Nacionalen Evrosong 2005 in order to select the Macedonian entry for the 2005 contest in Kyiv, Ukraine. Five artists were presented to the public in November 2004 and an eight-member jury panel and a public televote selected two artists to qualify to the compete in the competition on 19 February 2005, where "Ti si son" performed by Martin Vučić was selected following two rounds of voting from a twelve-member jury panel, an audience vote and a public televote. The song was later translated from Macedonian to English for the Eurovision Song Contest and was titled "Make My Day".

Macedonia competed in the semi-final of the Eurovision Song Contest which took place on 19 May 2005. Performing during the show in position 17, "Make My Day" was announced among the top 10 entries of the semi-final and therefore qualified to compete in the final on 21 May. It was later revealed that Macedonia placed ninth out of the 25 participating countries in the semi-final with 97 points. In the final, Macedonia performed in position 15 and placed seventeenth out of the 24 participating countries, scoring 52 points.

Background

The nation's best result in the contest to this point was fourteenth, which it achieved in 2004 with the song "Life" performed by Toše Proeski. The Macedonian national broadcaster, Macedonian Radio Television (MRT), broadcasts the event within Macedonia and organises the selection process for the nation's entry. Macedonia had previously selected their entry for the Eurovision Song Contest through both national finals and internal selections. MRT confirmed their intentions to participate at the 2005 Eurovision Song Contest on 22 October 2004. Since 1996, Macedonia selected their entries using a national final, a procedure that continued for their 2005 entry.

Before Eurovision

Nacionalen Evrosong 2005 
Nacionalen Evrosong 2005 was the national final organised by MRT that selected Macedonia's entry for the Eurovision Song Contest 2005. The competition took place on 19 February 2005 at the Universal Hall in Skopje, hosted by Karolina Petkovska and Aneta Andonova and was broadcast on MTV 1, MTV Sat and online via the broadcaster's official Eurovision Song Contest website eurosong.com.mk.

Artist selection
A sixteen-member committee each proposed eight artists for the competition and the six most nominated were presented to the public in a special show titled Eurosong Day in Macedonia, which took place on 7 November 2004 and was broadcast on MTV 1 and MTV Sat. On 9 November 2004, MRT announced that Kaliopi had withdrawn from the artist selection. Two artists qualified to the final by a 50/50 combination of public televoting which ran until 14 November 2004 and a jury panel consisting of seven individual members and an eighth aggregate 20-member press vote, which were announced on 14 November. Over 1,500 votes were registered by the televote.

Final 
The final took place on 19 February 2005 where each of the two finalists, Aleksandra Pileva and Martin Vučić, performed four candidate Eurovision songs: three selected from over 100 songs that MRT received through an open submission and one provided by the artists themselves for the competition. The winner was selected over two rounds of voting. In the first round, a combination of public televoting (1/3), votes cast by the venue audience (1/3) and a twelve-member jury panel (1/3) selected one song per finalist to advance to the second round. In the second round, the public, audience and jury vote selected "Ti si son" performed by Martin Vučić as the winner. In addition to the performances of the competing entries, the competition featured guest performances by Biba Dodeva, Andrijana Janevska, Iskra Trpeva, Tamara Todevska and 2004 Macedonian Junior Eurovision representative Martina Siljanovska.

Controversy 
The Macedonian national final sparked controversy due to the large discrepancy between the jury and public vote; Aleksandra Pileva won the televote in both rounds and but lost out to Martin Vučić despite receiving six times more votes than him in the second round. In addition, some of the audience members later admitted that they have been given free tickets to attend the show in order to vote for "Ti si son". Martin Vučić and his father Dragan Vučić (also the co-composer of "Ti si son") was physically and verbally assaulted outside the venue by the supporters of Pileva, while Macedonian Prime Minister Vlado Bučkovski who also attended the show expressed concern over the way the points were awarded. 

Macedonian Eurovision Head of Delegation Ivan Mircevski later stated that he was at fault for determining the voting system and that he personally apologised to both artists for the scandal. MRT released a statement on 25 February affirming Martin Vučić as the winner after no irregularities with the voting were found.

At Eurovision
According to Eurovision rules, all nations with the exceptions of the host country, the "Big Four" (France, Germany, Spain and the United Kingdom), and the ten highest placed finishers in the 2004 contest are required to qualify from the semi-final on 19 May 2005 in order to compete for the final on 21 May 2005; the top ten countries from the semi-final progress to the final. On 22 March 2005, a special allocation draw was held which determined the running order for the semi-final and Macedonia was set to perform in position 17, following the entry from Finland and before the entry from Andorra. Martin Vučić performed the English version of "Ti si son" at the contest, titled "Make My Day". At the end of the semi-final, Macedonia was announced as having finished in the top 10 and subsequently qualifying for the grand final. It was later revealed that Macedonia placed third in the semi-final, receiving a total of 185 points. The draw for the running order for the final was done by the presenters during the announcement of the ten qualifying countries during the semi-final and Macedonia was drawn to perform in position 15, following the entry from Sweden and before the entry from Ukraine. Macedonia placed seventeenth in the final, scoring 52 points.

The semi-final and final were broadcast in Macedonia on MTV 1 and MTV Sat with commentary by Milanka Rašić. The Macedonian spokesperson, who announced the Macedonian votes during the final, was Karolina Gočeva who previously represented Macedonia at the contest in 2002.

Voting 
Below is a breakdown of points awarded to Macedonia and awarded by Macedonia in the semi-final and grand final of the contest. The nation awarded its 12 points to Croatia in the semi-final and to Albania in the final of the contest.

Points awarded to Macedonia

Points awarded by Macedonia

References

2005
Countries in the Eurovision Song Contest 2005
Eurovision